Club Deportivo Xota Fútbol Sala, known as Osasuna Magna Gurpea for sponsorship reasons, is a Spanish futsal club based in Pamplona, in the autonomous community of Navarre. The club is sponsored currently (October 2013) by Magnesitas Navarras.

The club was founded in 1978 and her pavilion is Pabellón Anaitasuna with capacity of 2,500 seaters.

History

Founded in 1978 in Irurtzun, Navarre, Xota started as an amateur team in the regional leagues.

In 1993, Xota promoted to the second division and in 1998 the club moved to Pamplona after the first division.

In May 2017, Xota signed a collaboration agreement with football club CA Osasuna, changing its name to Club Atlético Osasuna Xota.

Sponsors
Canteras Alaiz - (1993–94)
Diario de Noticias - (1994–97)
Industrias Carsal - (1996–98)
MRA (Miguel Rico & Asociados) - (1997–10)
Ingeteam - (1999–02)
Gvtarra - (2002–06)
Triman - (2010–13)
Magnesitas Navarras - (2013–)
Gurpea Mantenimiento y Montaje Industrial - (2014–)

Season to season

19 seasons in Primera División
5 seasons in Segunda División
3 seasons in Segunda División B
1 seasons in Tercera División

Current squad

References

External links
Official Website
Profile at LNFS.es

 
Futsal clubs in Spain
Sport in Pamplona
Futsal clubs established in 1978
1978 establishments in Spain
Sports teams in Navarre